François Picard may refer to:

 François Picard (racing driver) (1921–1996), French racing driver
 François Picard (naturalist) (1879–1939), French naturalist
 François Picard (journalist), Franco-American journalist